Stipe Plazibat (born 31 August 1989) is a Croatian professional footballer who plays as a striker.

Career

FC Gifu
On 8 August 2013, Plazibat signed for J2 League side FC Gifu. He made his debut on 18 August, as an 85th-minute substitute versus Mito HollyHock. On 1 September, he scored his first goal for FC Gifu, scoring in the 82nd minute in a 2–1 loss to Tokyo Verdy, after coming on as a substitute at half time. On 11 July 2014, it was announced Plazibat had left the club.

V-Varen Nagasaki
On 15 July 2014, Plazibat signed for fellow J2 League side V-Varen Nagasaki.

Hougang United
On 30 January 2016, Plazibat joined S-League side Hougang United after impressing in 2 trial games with 3 goals and 2 assists. He scored his first competitive goal for the Cheetahs on his competitive debut, winning the Cheetahs' first 3 points of the season. He scored his second in as many games against title favourites Tampines Rovers FC. Plazibat's 5th goal in 5 games sent Hougang to the top of the table in the 5th round of the 2016 S.League season. In total, he scored 16 times in 24 league games for the Cheetahs before moving to Home United.

Home United
After his contract was not renewed by the Hougang United's Management, Plazibat moved to local rivals, Home United.

His start with the team saw him scoring in the AFC Cup qualifying round against Phnom Penh Crown over 2 legs while he also scored 4 goals in his Home United league debut in the 1st match in the 2017 season. He followed up his impressive early season form with 2 more goals against Brunei DPMM FC, bringing his league tally up to 6 goals from 2 games. He scored his 7th goal for Home in a top of the clash with Albirex Niigata(S) in his 3rd league game.

He continued his goalscoring form for the Protectors in a midweek AFC Cup game against Than Quảng Ninh, scoring 4 goals to help his side to a 5–4 victory in Vietnam, the second time he has scored 4 goals in 2017. This brings his total goals scored, in all competitions, to 11 goals in 8 games for his new club. He continued his fine goal scoring form by notching a brace in the uniform derby against Warriors FC, helping his side to a 2–2 draw. With that, he reached 10 goals in just 5 league appearances. It proved to be a productive season for Plazibat as he recorded 38 goals and 14 assists in all competitions for Home.

Bangkok Glass
He joined Bangkok Glass in January 2018, he left the club in June 2018. He scored a total of 3 goals in 9 games.  In August 2018, he had a week-long trial period with Dundee scoring a goal in a friendly against Falkirk.

Return to Solin
In September 2018, Plazibat returned to his first senior club Solin after failing to secure a contract with Scottish side Dundee F.C. despite scoring a goal and an assist in a trial game. On 21 September 2018, he made his second league debut for the club as a substitute in a 3–2 loss against Šibenik.

Return to Hougang United 
On 26 December 2018, Plazibat rejoined Hougang United for the 2019 Singapore Premier League season, looking to add on to the 16 goals he scored for the Cheetahs before moving to Home United. Having featured 51 times and scoring 25 goals in all competitions over 2 seasons, Plazibat had his contract with the Cheetahs extended for another season.⁣

Plazibat scored the first hat-trick of the 2020 Singapore Premier League season in his club's season opener against Young Lions, handing his club a 4–1 win.

Back to Home United (now known as Lion City Sailors) 
On 4 September 2020, it was announced that the Lion City Sailors had signed him for the rest of the 2020 season and 2021, replacing Andy Pengelly who left the club during mid-season.

Others

Singapore selection squad
He was selected as part of the Singapore selection squad for The Sultan of Selangor's Cup to be held on 6 May 2017.

However, due to an injury sustained in a S.League match, he had to pull out from the squad.

Career statistics

Honours
Nk Dugopolje
2. HNL: 2011–12

Lion City Sailors
Singapore Premier League: 2021

Individual
Singapore Premier League top scorer: 2020 (14 goals)

References

External links
 

1989 births
Living people
Footballers from Split, Croatia
Association football forwards
Croatian footballers
NK Solin players
HNK Šibenik players
NK Dugopolje players
FK Rabotnički players
FC Gifu players
V-Varen Nagasaki players
Hougang United FC players
Home United FC players
Stipe Plazibat
Lion City Sailors FC players
LPS HD Clinceni players
Perak F.C. players
Croatian Football League players
Macedonian First Football League players
J2 League players
First Football League (Croatia) players
Singapore Premier League players
Liga I players
Croatian expatriate footballers
Expatriate footballers in North Macedonia
Expatriate footballers in Japan
Expatriate footballers in Singapore
Expatriate footballers in Romania
Expatriate footballers in Malaysia
Croatian expatriate sportspeople in North Macedonia
Croatian expatriate sportspeople in Japan
Croatian expatriate sportspeople in Singapore
Croatian expatriate sportspeople in Romania
Croatian expatriate sportspeople in Malaysia